Daniel Héctor Ahmed (born 22 November 1965) is an Argentine football coach and former player who played as a forward. He is the current manager of Peruvian club Atlético Grau.

External links
 
 Profile at Futbol XXI at Fútbol XXI 
 
 larepublica.pe

1965 births
Living people
Argentine footballers
Association football forwards
San Lorenzo de Almagro footballers
Cádiz CF players
Cerro Porteño players
Deportes Concepción (Chile) footballers
Argentine football managers
Sporting Cristal managers
Club Alianza Lima managers
Atlético Grau managers
Argentine people of Syrian descent
Arab Christians
Argentine expatriate footballers
Argentine expatriate sportspeople in Chile
Expatriate footballers in Chile
Argentine expatriate sportspeople in Japan
Expatriate footballers in Japan
Argentine expatriate sportspeople in Spain
Expatriate footballers in Spain
Argentine expatriate sportspeople in Paraguay
Expatriate footballers in Paraguay
Argentine expatriate sportspeople in Peru
Expatriate football managers in Peru
Footballers from Buenos Aires